The Grass Is Greener is a 1956 two act comedy written by Hugh Williams and Margaret Williams. It opened at St. Martin's Theatre in the West End of London, on 2 December. Joan Greenwood starred as Hattie, Countess of Rhyall,  with Williams playing Victor, Earl of Rhyall, Edward Underdown playing Charles, an American tourist and Celia Johnson playing Hilary. Jack Minster directed.

Plot 
The Earl and Countess of Rhyall, needing revenue, open their residence Hampshire manor to tourists. A visiting American falls in love with Earl's wife; the Earl in turn, attempts to use an old flame to make his wife jealous.

Critical reception 
J. C. Trewin includes The Grass Is Greener as one of the top four plays of 1958–59 . He describes The Grass Is Greener as the best of the Williamses' three comedies, noting its "glancing wit" and "well bred ease." Trewin describes the play as "neatly constructed," with much of the comedy coming from "apparent irrelevance."

Film 
The Williamses wrote the screenplay for the 1960 film adaptation The Grass Is Greener, with Cary Grant and Deborah Kerr playing the lead roles.

References 

Comedy plays
West End plays
1952 plays
British plays